The 2020 iHeartRadio Music Awards were originally scheduled to take place on March 29, 2020. The ceremony was to be hosted by Usher and air on Fox. Online listener voting on all categories continued as previously scheduled until March 23, with the Best Fan Army category remaining open for voting until March 27. The event was subsequently cancelled on August 24, 2020 due to the COVID-19 pandemic, and winners were revealed on September 4 to 7, 2020. Following the cancellation, Usher would subsequently host the 2021 ceremony on May 27, 2021 instead.

The most awarded artist was Billie Eilish with four. The most nominated artists were Eilish and Shawn Mendes with seven each, followed by Taylor Swift and Camila Cabello who tied with six.

Impact of the COVID-19 pandemic

The ceremony was originally to take place at the Shrine Auditorium in Los Angeles, which was scheduled on March 29, 2020. On March 12, due to the state of California restricting gatherings to 250 people in response to the COVID-19 outbreak, which it had already declared a pandemic by the World Health Organization, and has cancelled scores of television events through March into July, along with postponing the ACM Awards and Billboard Music Awards. On the morning of March 16, iHeartMedia announced the ceremony's official postponement.

Half of the ceremony's original March 29 timeslot was retained by iHeartMedia, with both them and Fox then promoting a series of musical performances from several popular artists and bands performing from home via video and teleconferencing platforms compiled together as the iHeart Living Room Concert for America hosted by Elton John, along with charitable appeals for Feeding America and the First Responders Children's Foundation. The program also aired over a number of iHeartRadio stations nationwide, and was simulcast on Fox Sports 1/2, Fox Soccer Plus, Fox News Channel, Fox Business Network, the Big Ten Network, and Fox Deportes. On August 24, 2020, it was announced that the ceremony had been cancelled and that the winners would be announced through the iHeartRadio stations over Labor Day weekend.

Winners and nominees

References

2020
2020 music awards
2020 in Los Angeles
2020 awards in the United States
Music events cancelled due to the COVID-19 pandemic
Cancelled events in the United States